Colette Besson (7 April 1946 – 9 August 2005) was a French athlete, the surprise winner of the 400 m at the 1968 Summer Olympics in Mexico City.

Athletic career
Prior to the 1968 Olympics, Besson, an unknown physical education teacher, qualified for the 400 m event. In the final, Britain's Lillian Board – the favourite for the gold – was way ahead of the rest of the field with just 100 m to go. With an amazing last sprint, Besson then moved up from fifth place to beat Board on the finish line by a tenth of a second. Her winning time of 52.03 seconds was 1.8 seconds better than her personal best.

The next year, Besson came close to winning another international title at the European Championships. In the 400 m final, she crossed the line almost level with her teammate Nicole Duclos, both in the world record time of 51.7. However, Duclos was awarded the victory after examination of the photo finish. In the 4 × 400 m relay final, Besson, who was anchoring the French team, passed the finish line at the same moment as Lillian Board. Again, photo finish evidence determined Besson had come second.

After 1969, Besson would not win any more international medals. She qualified for the 1972 Summer Olympics in Munich, but was eliminated in the preliminaries, although she took fourth place in the relay. She retired from athletics in 1977.

Death
Besson died on 9 August 2005 of cancer, two years after being diagnosed with the disease.

References

1946 births
2005 deaths
Sportspeople from Charente-Maritime
French female sprinters
Olympic athletes of France
Olympic gold medalists for France
Athletes (track and field) at the 1968 Summer Olympics
Athletes (track and field) at the 1972 Summer Olympics
Deaths from cancer in France
European Athletics Championships medalists
Medalists at the 1968 Summer Olympics
Olympic gold medalists in athletics (track and field)
Mediterranean Games gold medalists for France
Athletes (track and field) at the 1971 Mediterranean Games
Mediterranean Games medalists in athletics
20th-century French women
Olympic female sprinters